The 2017 Copa Verde Finals was the final two-legged tie that decided the 2017 Copa Verde, the 4th season of the Copa Verde, Brazil's regional cup football tournament organised by the Brazilian Football Confederation.

The finals were contested in a two-legged home-and-away format between Luverdense, from Mato Grosso, and Paysandu, from Pará.

Luverdense defeated Paysandu 4–2 on aggregate to win their first Copa Verde title.

Teams

Road to the final
Note: In all scores below, the score of the home team is given first.

Format
The finals were played on a home-and-away two-legged basis. If tied on aggregate, the penalty shoot-out was used to determine the winner.

Matches

First leg

Second leg

See also
2018 Copa do Brasil

References

Copa Verde Finals